Ladislaus Weinek (13 February 1848, Buda – 12 November 1913, Prague) was an Austro-Hungarian astronomer.

He was educated in Vienna, and worked for a period at the photography laboratories in Schwerin.

In 1874 he joined a German expedition to the Kerguelen Islands to observe a transit of Venus across the face of the Sun. His results from the expedition were published in Nova Acta Leopoldina.

In 1883 he became a professor in Prague and was the ninth director of the Klementinum observatory. There, on 27 November 1885, he took the first known photograph of a meteor. He set up observing stations in Prague and Jena (to observe the Andromedids shower of that year, which turned out to be very intense), and caught a 7mm-long trail on a plate in Prague. 

In collaboration with Friedrich Küstner, he made measurements of the height of the pole. During their investigations they also discovered polar motion, the movement of the Earth's polar axis relative to the crust.

Using images taken at the Lick Observatory and the Meudon Observatory, he produced the first atlas of the Moon that was based on photographs.

The crater Weinek on the Moon and the asteroid 7114 Weinek are named after him.

References

External links 
 Lunární kráter Weinek – historická pocta klementinskému astronomovi
 Scheller, A., 1914, "Anzeige des Todes von Ladislaus Weinek", Astronomische Nachrichten, vol. 196.
 Magyar Életrajzi Lexikon 1000-1990 at www.mek.iif.hu

19th-century Hungarian astronomers
19th-century Austrian astronomers
Austro-Hungarian people
Hungarian expatriates in Germany
Hungarian expatriates in the Czech lands
People from Buda
1848 births
1913 deaths